Clarence Belmont Coolidge (August 26, 1850 – January 8, 1895) was Warden of the Borough of Norwalk, Connecticut from 1889 to 1890.

He was born in Lawrence, Massachusetts, the son of William S. Coolidge and Elizabeth Seaver Coolidge. He moved to Norwalk, Connecticut at the age of twelve.

He was a partner with Samuel E. Olmstead in Olmstead S E & Co., an iron foundry.

In 1894, he served as a justice of the peace, a notary, a water commissioner, and as a registrar of voters.

References 

1850 births
1895 deaths
Foundrymen
Mayors of Norwalk, Connecticut
Politicians from Lawrence, Massachusetts
19th-century American politicians